Jennifer Hollett (born September 16, 1975) is a Canadian media executive and former television personality and political activist. She was the 2015 New Democratic Party's candidate in the new riding of University—Rosedale. Hollett has a Bachelor of Arts with Distinction in Journalism and Communications from Concordia University in Montreal, and a Masters in Public Administration from the John F. Kennedy School of Government at Harvard University.

Hollett was a contributor to CBC News Network's prime time show Connect with Mark Kelley and was formerly a MuchMusic VJ and videographer, she hosted MuchOnDemand, Much In Your Space, Combat Zone, Power Shift, Count Down, Live@Much and some specials until leaving the network in 2005. Hollett started out as a radio jockey at Concordia University.

Her working career started with Sony Music Canada in the New Media Division working on websites for artists such as Our Lady Peace, Prozzak and Céline Dion. She later moved up to CTV, then to MuchMusic. She hosted "The Chatroom" on TalkTV on the recommendation of a CTV producer she met at Sony. At the end of that year, she was hired by MuchMusic.

In 2006, Hollett volunteered for CARE Canada, touring Canadian Secondary Schools and speaking to youth about her experiences in Kenya with the organization. Hollett has also managed e-communications for Plan Canada (2009), worked with Journalists for Human Rights (2007-2008) to train journalists in Sierra Leone. She is an advocate of girls' and women's rights, and has acted as the Official Summit Moderator for the G(irls)20 Summits in Toronto (2010), Paris (2011), Mexico City (2012), Moscow (2013), Sydney (2014).

While at Harvard, Hollett developed the 'Super Pac App', which helped viewers better understand television campaign ads during the 2012 U.S. election. By recording a snippet of audio from a television ad as it plays, a user can learn who paid for the ad, how much money that political group has raised and spent so far, and through links to nonpartisan news sources, learn about how truthful the claims in the ad are.

Hollett's past includes working with The Leading Change Network to train community activists with Marshall Ganz, a strategist credited with helping to devise the successful grass roots organizing model and training for Barack Obama’s 2008 presidential campaign.

She was an Atkinson Associate on Civic Technology  and a Broadbent Leadership Fellow.

Her public speaking appearances include the Hart House Hancock Lecture  and TEDx.

Hollett was head of news and government for Twitter in Canada.  And became the executive director of the Walrus' in June 2020.

Political career 
In 2013, she sought to be the New Democratic Party's candidate in Toronto Centre for that riding's pending federal by-election, but was defeated for the nomination by Linda McQuaig on September 15, 2013.

Considered a star candidate for the NDP in the newly created federal riding of University—Rosedale in downtown Toronto, Hollett lost her 2015 run for Parliament to Chrystia Freeland of the Liberal Party by a margin of 50% to 28%.

Hollett was a candidate for Toronto city councillor in 2018 until Premier Doug Ford cut city council from 47 seats to 25 seats two-thirds the way into the campaign. She was part of the legal challenge to Bill 5.

Electoral record

References

External links
Jennifer Hollett for University-Rosedale 
MuchMusic Official Website
CARE Canada
G(irls)20 Summit
The Leading Change Network
Hart House Hancock Lecture
Atkinson Foundation
How to Hate Politics by Jennifer Hollett
Broadbent Institute
Jennifer Hollett on Twitter

Much (TV channel) personalities
Canadian television reporters and correspondents
Harvard Kennedy School alumni
Living people
Concordia University alumni
1975 births
Canadian women television journalists
New Democratic Party candidates for the Canadian House of Commons
Canadian VJs (media personalities)
Canadian media executives
Twitter, Inc. people
Magazine people